Kalin Bankov (born 12 May 1965) is a former Bulgarian professional footballer who played as a defender in Bulgaria and the United States.

Career
Born in Sofia, Bankov played for Levski Sofia, Etar Veliko Tarnovo, Slavia Sofia, CSKA Sofia, Minyor Pernik, the Nashville Metros, the Minnesota Thunder, the Tampa Bay Mutiny and the Rochester Rhinos.

Bankov also earned seven caps for the Bulgarian national team during a two-year international career.

References

External links

Profile at Levskisofia.info

1965 births
Living people
Bulgarian footballers
Bulgaria international footballers
PFC Levski Sofia players
FC Etar Veliko Tarnovo players
PFC Slavia Sofia players
PFC CSKA Sofia players
Akademik Sofia players
PFC Minyor Pernik players
Tampa Bay Mutiny players
Nashville Metros players
Minnesota Thunder players
Rochester New York FC players
First Professional Football League (Bulgaria) players
Major League Soccer players
A-League (1995–2004) players
Bulgarian expatriate sportspeople in the United States
Association football defenders
Footballers from Sofia